Eskilstuna Energy and Environment (EEM) is a company based in Eskilstuna, Sweden which manages the sale and distribution of electricity, as well as district heating and cooling, water, sewage, waste management, biogas and broadband.  It is also involved in a number of international environmental projects.  
 
EEM consists of BioPartner, Metropolitan Area Network, Water and Sewage, Heating and Recycling. Power Sales and Power Supply System are subsidiaries. Power supply system is responsible for processing and distributing electricity to customers in Eskilstuna and Power sales main task is to buy electricity at the power exchange and sell electricity to customers within Sweden.

Eskilstuna Energy and Environment is also a partner in SEVAB Strängnäs Energy AB.

Production 
Electricity, heating and cooling in the CHP plant in Eskilstuna
Biogas production and wastewater treatment plants in Ekeby, Eskilstuna
Purification of raw water and the production of drinking water at Hyndevad water production facility in Eskilstuna
Solid waste treatment and recycling center at Lilla Nyby, Eskilstuna

Environment 
Eskilstuna Energy and Environment acts on a broad front in the energy and environmental industry and has an activity imbued with energy-efficient solutions, both for internal and external services. Eskilstuna Energy and Environment is certified according to ISO 14001 since 2002. Since 2013 they are also an approved issuer of Diploma of standard Svensk Miljöbas.

The business area BioPartner has developed the concept EkoTrav where environmentally friendly and energy efficient solutions for electricity, heating and waste management are tailored for horse racing tracks. The first horse racing track given the EkoTrav diploma is Sundbyholm horse racing track in Eskilstuna.

In the Eskilstuna municipality, all household solid waste is recycled with optical color sorting since 2011, which is a new way of recycling. Each waste fraction has its own colored recyclable plastic bag and is disposed of in the same garbage bin. By using optical color sorting, house owners are able to sort out organic food waste, plastic, metal and paper packaging, newspapers and household waste. The organic food waste is then used to produce biogas and the other five fractions are recycled and reused. The system of six different fractions is unique of its kind in Europe.

International projects 
Eskilstuna Energy and Environment is involved in a number of international environmental projects. 
 
"Waste to Energy" in India is a project run by the Swedish Energy Agency and aims to export Swedish environmental technology and expertise in this field. Eskilstuna Energy and Environment is participating in the project as representatives and experts in municipal engineering, including waste collection, recycling, biogas production and waste incineration.

Since 2009 Eskilstuna Municipality has collaborated with Mysore City Corporation of India. Eskilstuna Energy and Environment conducted a feasibility study for the city's potential to produce biogas.

The European Union project Planning for Energy Efficient Cities (PLEEC) is led by Eskilstuna Energy and Environment.  Its aim is to make European cities more energy effective from 2013-2015. The project is expected to contribute to the goal of EU and Sweden in reducing energy consumption in European cities by 20% by 2020. The project also involved Eskilstuna Municipality and Mälardalen University along with 15 other cities and organizations in 11 European countries.

History 

 1860 Street Lights powered by hydrogen are installed in Eskilstuna.
 1887 The water production plant is built in Tunafors and most of Eskilstuna’s 9,500 households adhere to the water mains.
 1895 The power generator is built.
 1908 The gaswork is finished and then used until 1984, when it is replaced by the wood chip boiler.
 1960 The landfill at Lilla Nyby opens.
 1973 The municipality's technical activities move under the newly formed Technical works office.
 1986 Chip boiler at the heating plant is completed and eco-friendly wood chips are used instead of oil.
 1993 The Technical works office is dissolved in various business departments. Eskilstuna Energy and Environment Ltd. is formed when the electricity market is deregulated. The company is divided into one mother company and the 2 subsidiaries, Power Supply Systems and Power Sales.
 1996 Eskilstuna municipality forms Eskilstuna Municipality Corporate Group where Eskilstuna Energy and Environment Ltd, Eskilstuna Property Ltd and Parken Zoo Ltd are included.
 2000 The power plant is completed and begins supplying electricity to the grid.
 2003 Biogas production begins at the Ekeby waste water treatment plant. In the same year, ten of Eskilstuna city’s buses run on biogas.
 2004 The public Biogas station is put into use.
 2011 The inauguration of the plant for optical sorting of waste (called color sorting) was held at the recycling center Lilla Nyby. That same year Eskilstuna won the prestigious “Swedish Recycling Award” with the motivation: "Eskilstuna Energy and Environment has streamlined the requirements for recycling of solid waste in general and of producer materials in particular. The company has worked through pragmatic solutions and by common thoughts. The municipality now has a unique and innovative way of taking care of household waste while providing the citizens with important feedback through information and statistics. Eskilstuna Energy and Environment has set focus on recycling and thereby helped to increase recycling while being able to maintain a good quality of the recycled material." .

References

External links
Eskilstuna Energy and Environment company website—

Electric power companies of Sweden
Water treatment facilities
Eskilstuna
Water in Sweden
Energy companies established in 1993
Swedish companies established in 1993
Electric power distribution network operators in Sweden
Electricity retailers in Sweden
Companies based in Södermanland County